Peter Alban Kelland (20 September 1926 – 24 October 2011) was an English cricketer. Kelland was a right-handed batsman who bowled right-arm fast-medium. He was born at Pinner, Middlesex, to Parents Rev Alban Joseph Kelland and Stella Prynne.

Kelland was educated at Repton School during World War II, where he was Head of his House and played in the school cricket team. Alongside Donald Carr, the school's captain, he was the school's main bowler, taking 43 wickets in 1944. No school side Repton played against during this period managed to make a score of at least 100 against them. After leaving Repton, he spent two years in the Royal Marines. After two years in the Marines he began his studies at the University of Cambridge. He made his first-class debut for Cambridge University Cricket Club against Sussex at Fenner's in 1949. He made eleven further first-class appearances for the university, the last of which came against Oxford University in The University Match at Lord's in 1950. In twelve first-class matches for the university, he took 26 wickets at an average of 35.46, with best figures of 3/24. With the bat, he scored 55 runs at a batting average of 9.16, with a high score of 25. In what was a strong Oxford University side of the time, no fewer than eight members of it would go on to represent England in Test cricket.

He later briefly played first-class cricket for Sussex, making three appearances against Cambridge University at Fenner's in 1951 and Worcestershire and Essex in the 1952 County Championship, with both matches played at The Saffrons, Eastbourne. However, he was not successful in these matches, taking just a single wicket, as well as scoring 17 runs. He then went into teaching, after which he never appeared in first-class cricket again. He spent most of his career teaching at Highgate School, London, where he is credited with spotting the cricketing talent of the young Phil Tufnell. He died at Loughborough, Leicestershire, on 24 October 2011.

References

External links
Peter Kelland at ESPNcricinfo
Peter Kelland at CricketArchive

1926 births
2011 deaths
People from Pinner
People educated at Repton School
Alumni of the University of Cambridge
English cricketers
Cambridge University cricketers
Sussex cricketers
Schoolteachers from London
20th-century Royal Marines personnel